Darunak (also Romanized as Darūnak and Dorūnak; also known as Dow Rūnak and Durunak) is a village in Dorunak Rural District, Zeydun District, Behbahan County, Khuzestan Province, Iran. At the 2006 census, its population was 722, in 168 families.

References 

Populated places in Behbahan County